Aci Castello is a comune in the Metropolitan City of Catania in Sicily, Italy. The primary economic sectors are agriculture and industry (in Catania). The city is neighbored by Aci Catena, Acireale, Catania, San Gregorio di Catania and Valverde.

History

The town of Aci Castello developed around the castle, which was built in 1076 by the Normans upon the foundations of a 7th-century Byzantine fortification. In 1169, Aci Castello started to expand after an eruption of Mount Etna made the towns in its vicinity uninhabitable. The castle later became the property of the bishops of Catania.

In 1296, Roger of Lauria, admiral of the Aragonese fleet during the War of the Sicilian Vespers, was granted the fief of Aci and its castle as a reward for his faithful service to King Frederick III of Sicily. When relations between the two men soured and di Lauria transferred his loyalties to the Angevins, the castle was besieged and captured by King Frederick and di Lauria stripped of his fiefs. In 1320, the castle and Aci were taken from Roger's descendant, Margaret of Lauria and given to Blasco II de Alagona. Whilst the latter was away defending Palermo from the attacking Angevins, Bertrando di Balzo sacked Aci in his absence.

Main sights

 The Norman Castle, built from 1076 to 1081. It now serves as a museum.
 The borough Aci Trezza with a beach
 Church of St. Joseph (18th century)
 Greek Necropolis

Sports
Sporting Club Pallanuoto Acicastello

References